Lock and Dam No. 7 is a lock and dam located on the Upper Mississippi River at river mile 702.5 near the cities of La Crescent, Minnesota and Onalaska, Wisconsin. It forms pool 7 and Lake Onalaska. The facility was constructed in the mid-1930s and placed in operation on April, 1937. It underwent major rehabilitation from 1989 through 2002. The lock and dam are owned and operated by the St. Paul District of the United States Army Corps of Engineers-Mississippi Valley Division.

The lock and dam is one of the most visited because of its proximity to Interstate 90, and is clearly visible to travelers crossing the I-90 Mississippi River Bridge.

See also
 I-90 Mississippi River Bridge, just downstream.
 Upper Mississippi River National Wildlife and Fish Refuge
 Public Works Administration Dams List

Notes

External links
USGS Reach 1 pool 7
U.S. Army Corps of Engineers, St. Paul District: Lock and Dam 7 brochure

Mississippi River locks
Driftless Area
Buildings and structures in La Crosse County, Wisconsin
Buildings and structures in Winona County, Minnesota
Transportation in Winona County, Minnesota
Dams in Minnesota
Dams in Wisconsin
Historic American Engineering Record in Minnesota
Historic American Engineering Record in Wisconsin
United States Army Corps of Engineers dams
Transport infrastructure completed in 1937
Roller dams
Gravity dams
Dams on the Mississippi River
Mississippi Valley Division
1937 establishments in Minnesota
1937 establishments in Wisconsin
Locks of Minnesota
Locks of Wisconsin